The NUTS codes of Hungary have three levels:

Codes

Local administrative units

Below the NUTS levels, the two LAU (Local Administrative Units) levels are:

The LAU codes of Hungary can be downloaded here:

Changes in NUTS 2016 classification 
The NUTS classification is regularly updated to reflect changes and modifications proposed by Member States. As part of this process the European Commission has adopted changes concerning Hungary in December 2016. The new classification that has been introduced have split the region Central Hungary in two: Budapest (previously HU101) and Pest county (previously HU102). The new classification is in use since 1 January 2018.

See also
 ISO 3166-2 codes of Hungary
 FIPS region codes of Hungary
 Regions of Hungary
 Counties of Hungary
 Districts of Hungary (from 2013)
 Subregions of Hungary (until 2013)
 Administrative divisions of the Kingdom of Hungary (until 1918)
 Counties of the Kingdom of Hungary
 Administrative divisions of the Kingdom of Hungary (1941–44)
 List of cities and towns of Hungary

Sources
 Hierarchical list of the Nomenclature of territorial units for statistics - NUTS and the Statistical regions of Europe
 Overview map of EU Countries - NUTS level 1
 MAGYARORSZÁG - NUTS level 2
 MAGYARORSZÁG - NUTS level 3
 Correspondence between the NUTS levels and the national administrative units
 List of current NUTS codes 
 Download current NUTS codes (ODS format) 
 Counties of Hungary, Statoids.com

External links
 Eurostat - Portrait of the regions (forum.europa.eu.int)
 Comparative analysis of some Hungarian regions by using “COCO” method  (DOC file) (HTML version)
 Magyarország – NUTS level 3 (PDF; at the website of the Hungarian Prime Minister's Office )
 Regions of Hungary (at Hungary.hu, the Government Portal of Hungary)
  Hungary and the regions

Hungary
Nuts